Kokorino is a rural locality (a selo) in Ivolginsky District, Republic of Buryatia, Russia. The population was 747 as of 2010. There are 9 streets.

Geography 
Kokorino is located 33 km southwest of Ivolginsk (the district's administrative centre) by road. Khuramsha is the nearest rural locality.

References 

Rural localities in Ivolginsky District